Blue Drop

 Blue Drop, a Japanese manga
 Blue Drops, a Japanese pop duo consisting of Hitomi Yoshida and Saori Hayami, organized for Japanese anime series Heaven's Lost Property